William St Paul Gellibrand (18 December 1823 – 22 August 1905) was an Australian politician.

Gellibrand was born at sea in 1823. In 1871 he was elected to the Tasmanian House of Assembly, representing the seat of Fingal, but he was defeated the following year. He returned in 1874 as the member for Ringwood, serving until 1886. He died in 1905 in Hobart.

References

1823 births
1905 deaths
Members of the Tasmanian House of Assembly
People born at sea